Leonard Bernstein, an American composer and conductor, won several Grammy Awards and Tony Awards over his lifetime. His awards are both for his conducting and his compositions.

Academy Awards 
The Academy Awards, or "Oscars", are a set of awards given annually for excellence of cinematic achievements. The awards, organized by the Academy of Motion Picture Arts and Sciences (AMPAS), were first held in 1929 at the Hollywood Roosevelt Hotel.

!
|-
!scope="row"| 1954
| On the Waterfront
| Music Score of a Dramatic or Comedy Picture
| 
| 
|-
|}

Emmy Awards (Primetime)
The Emmy Award, often referred to simply as the Emmy, recognizes excellence in the television industry.

|-
|rowspan=2| 1957
|Himself
| Best Male Personality- Continuing Performance
| 
|-
| rowspan=2|Omnibus
| rowspan=2|Best Musical Contribution for Television
| 
|-
!scope="row"| 1958
| 
|-
!scope="row"| 1961
| Leonard Bernstein and the New York Philharmonic
| Outstanding Achievement in the Field of Music for Television
| 
|-
!scope="row"|1965
| New York Philharmonic Young People's Concerts with Leonard Bernstein
| Outstanding Individual Achievements in Entertainment- Actors and Performers
| 
|-
!scope="row"|1972
| Beethoven's Birthday: A Celebration in Vienna with Leonard Bernstein
| Outstanding Single Program - Variety or Musical - Classical Music
| 
|-
!scope="row"|1973
| Bernstein in London Special of the Week
| Outstanding Single Program - Classical Music
| 
|-
!scope="row"|1975
| Bernstein at Tanglewood Great Performances
|  rowspan=2|Outstanding Classical Music Program
| 
|-
!scope="row"|1976
| Bernstein and The New York Philharmonic Great Performances

| 
|-
!scope="row"|1982
| Bernstein/Beethoven
|  rowspan=3|Outstanding Classical Program in the Performing Arts
| 
|-
!scope="row"|1984
| Bernstein: Conductor, Soloist and Teacher (Great Performances)
| 
|-
!scope="row"|1985
| Bernstein Conducts "West Side Story" (Great Performances)
| 
|-
!scope="row"|1987
| Carnegie Hall: The Grand Reopening
| Outstanding Individual Achievement - Classical Music-Dance Programming- Performing
| 
|-
|}

Grammy Awards
The Grammy Awards are awarded annually by The Recording Academy of the United States (formerly the National Academy of Recording Arts and Sciences or NARAS) for outstanding achievements in the music industry. Often considered the highest music honor, the awards were established in 1958.

|-
|1958
| Stravinsky: Le Sacre Du Printemps
|rowspan=2| Best Classical Performance - Orchestra
| 
|-
|rowspan=2|1960
|rowspan=2| Ives: Symphony No. 2
| 
|-
|Best Contemporary Classical Composition
| 
|-
|rowspan=4|1961
|Beethoven: Missa Solemnis
|Best Classical Performance - Choral (other than opera)
| 
|-
| Bloch: Sacred Service
| Album of the Year- Classical
| 
|-
| Prokofiev: Peter and the Wolf
| Best Recording for Children
| 
|-
| Humor in Music
| Best Documentary Or Spoken Word Recording (Other Than Comedy)
| 
|-
|rowspan=5|1962
| rowspan=2|Mahler: Symphony No. 3 In D Minor
|Best Classical Performance - Choral (other than opera)
| 
|-
|Best Classical Performance - Orchestra
| 
|-
| Götterdämmerung - Brunnhilde's Immolation Scene/Wesendonck Songs
| Best Classical Performance - Vocal Soloist (with or without orchestra)
| 
|-
| Saint-Saëns: Carnival of the Animals/Britten: Young Person's Guide to the Orchestra
| Best Recording for Children
| 
|-
| First Performance: Lincoln Center For The Performing Arts
| Best Documentary Or Spoken Word Recording (Other Than Comedy)
| 
|-
|rowspan=4|1963
|Bach: St. Matthew Passion
|rowspan=2|Best Classical Performance - Choral (other than opera)
| 
|-
| Milhaud: Les Choephores
| 
|-
| The Joy of Christmas
| Best Performance by a Chorus
| 
|-
| Bernstein Conducts for Young People
| Best Recording for Children
| 
|-
|rowspan=3|1964
| Mahler: Symphony No. 2 In C Minor ("Resurrection") 
|Best Classical Performance - Orchestra
| 
|-
|rowspan=2| Bernstein: Symphony No. 3 "Kaddish"
| Best Composition by a Contemporary Composer
| 
|-
| Album of the Year- Classical
| 
|-
|1965
| Chichester Psalms
| Best Composition by a Contemporary Composer
| 
|-
|1966
| Ives: Fourth Of July 
|Best Classical Performance - Orchestra
| 
|-
|rowspan=6|1967
|rowspan=2| Das Lied von der Erde
|Best Classical Performance - Orchestra
| 
|-
|rowspan=3| Album of the Year- Classical
| 
|-
| The World Of Charles Ives (Washington's Birthday, Robert Browning Overture)
| 
|-
| Mahler: Symphony No. 8 (Symphony of a Thousand)
| 
|-
|Falstaff
| Best Opera Recording
| 
|-
| Mahler: Symphony No. 8 in E Flat Major (Symphony of a Thousand)|Best Classical Performance - Choral (other than opera)
| 
|-
|rowspan=2|1968
| Mahler: Symphony No. 6 in A Minor and  Symphony No. 9 in D Major|Best Classical Performance - Orchestra
| 
|-
| Haydn: The Creation|Best Choral Performance (other than opera)
| 
|-
|rowspan=3|1972
|rowspan=2| Bernstein: Mass|Album of the Year- Classical
| 
|-
|Best Choral Performance - Classical (other than opera)
| 
|-
| Strauss: Der Rosenkavalier| Best Opera Recording
| 
|-
|rowspan=4|1973
| Holst: The Planets|Best Classical Performance - Orchestra
| 
|-
| Haydn: Mass In Time Of War (Leonard Bernstein's Concert For Peace)|Best Choral Performance - Classical (other than opera)
| 
|-
|rowspan=2| Bizet: Carmen|Best Classical Album
| 
|-
| Best Opera Recording
| 
|-
|rowspan=3|1974
| Bernstein Conducts Ravel
|rowspan=2|Best Classical Performance - Orchestra
| 
|-
|rowspan=2| Mahler: Symphony No. 2 in C Minor| 
|-

|Best Classical Album
| 
|-
|rowspan=2|1975
| Haydn: Harmoniemesse |rowspan=2|Best Choral Performance - Classical (other than opera)
| 
|-
| Mahler: Kindertotenlieder| 
|-
|1976
| Berlioz: Requiem|Best Choral Performance - Classical (other than opera)
| 
|-
|1977
|Concert of the Century|Best Classical Album
| 
|-
|rowspan=2|1978
| Haydn: Mass No. 9 In D Minor ("Lord Nelson Mass")|rowspan=3|Best Choral Performance - Classical (other than opera)
| 
|-
| Stravinsky: Les Noces and Mass| 
|-
|1979
| Beethoven: Missa solemnis| 
|-
|rowspan=2|1980
| Beethoven: Symphony No. 9|rowspan=2|Best Orchestral Recording
| 
|-
| Shostakovich: Symphony No. 5| 
|-
|rowspan=3|1983
|Bernstein: Symphonic Dances from West Side Story And Candide Overture/ Barber: Adagio For Strings/ Schuman: American Festival Overture
|Best Orchestral Recording
| 
|-
|Wagner: Tristan und Isolde|Best Opera Recording
| 
|-
|Gershwin: Rhapsody in Blue| Best Classical Performance - Instrumental Soloist or Soloists (with orchestra)
| 
|-
|1985
| Himself
|Lifetime Achievement Award
| 
|-
|1987
|Copland: Symphony No. 3/Quiet City|Best Orchestral Recording
| 
|-
|rowspan=5|1988
|rowspan=2| Mahler: Symphony No. 2 in C Minor "Resurrection"|Best Classical Album
| 
|-
|Best Orchestral Recording
| 
|-
| Puccini: La bohème|rowspan=2| Best Opera Recording
| 
|-
|rowspan=2| Bernstein/Stephen Wadsworth: A Quiet Place| 
|-
| Best Contemporary Composition
| 
|-
|1989
|Mahler: Symphony No. 3 in D Minor|Best Orchestral Performance
| 
|-
|rowspan=5|1990
| Bernstein In Berlin-Beethoven: Sym. No. 9
|Best Long Form Music Video
| 
|-
| Bernstein: Arias & Barcarolles
| Best Contemporary Composition
| 
|-
| Shostakovich: Symphonies Nos. 1 & 7|rowspan=2|Best Orchestral Performance
| 
|-
|rowspan=2|Ives: Symphony No. 2; Gong on the Hook and Ladder; Central Park in the Dark; The Unanswered Question| 
|-
|Best Classical Album
| 
|-
|rowspan=2|1991
|rowspan=2|Bernstein: Candide  
|Best Classical Album
| 
|-
|Best Engineered Album, Classical
| 
|-
|rowspan=2|1992
| rowspan=2| Mahler: Symphony No. 9|Best Classical Album
| 
|-
|Best Orchestral Performance
| 
|-
|2010
| West Side Story|Best Musical Theater Album
| 
|}

 Kennedy Center Honors 

 National Medal of Arts 

In 1989, Leonard Bernstein refused his award, allegedly due to how a federal grant to an art show on AIDS had been revoked.

 Tony Awards 
The Tony Awards recognize achievements in Broadway theatre. The awards, presented by the American Theatre Wing and The Broadway League, were first held in 1947 at the Waldorf Astoria New York.

|-
!scope="row"| 1953
| Wonderful Town| Best Musical
| 
|-
!scope="row"| 1957
| Candide| Best Musical
| 
|-
|-
!scope="row"| 1958
| West Side Story''
| Best Musical
| 
|-
|-
!scope="row"| 1969
| Himself
| Special Tony Award
| 
|-
|}

References

Lists of awards received by American musician
Awards